Knocktopher was a constituency represented in the Irish House of Commons until 1800, based on the parliamentary borough of Knocktopher in County Kilkenny.

History
In the Patriot Parliament of 1689 summoned by James II, Knocktopher was represented with two members.

Members of Parliament
1661–1666 Sir Patrick Weymes (died and replaced 1661 by James Weymes) and Oliver Jones (died and replaced 1664 by Sir Maurice Eustace, junior)

1689–1801

Notes

References

Bibliography

Constituencies of the Parliament of Ireland (pre-1801)
Historic constituencies in County Kilkenny
1800 disestablishments in Ireland
Constituencies disestablished in 1800